Fort Lewis College is a public liberal arts college in Durango, Colorado. Because of its unique origins as a military fort turned Indian boarding school turned state public school, FLC follows a 1911 mandate to give qualified Native Americans a tuition-free education and awards approximately 16% of the baccalaureate degrees earned by Native American students in the nation. In 2008, the U.S. Department of Education designated FLC one of six Native American-serving, non-tribal colleges.

FLC is a member of the Council of Public Liberal Arts Colleges and is accredited by the Higher Learning Commission, with additional program-level accreditations for specific programs. The college offers 30 bachelor's degrees through its four academic units.

History
The first Fort Lewis army post was constructed in Pagosa Springs, Colorado, in 1878, and was relocated in 1880 to Hesperus, Colorado, on the southern slopes of the La Plata Mountains. In 1891, Fort Lewis was decommissioned and converted into a federal, off-reservation Indian boarding school.

In 1911, the fort's property and buildings in Hesperus were transferred to the state of Colorado to establish an "agricultural and mechanic arts high school." That deed came with two conditions: that the land would be used for an educational institution, and “to be maintained as an institution of learning to which Indian students will be admitted free of tuition and on an equality with white students” in perpetuity. Both conditions have been the missions and guides for the Fort Lewis school's various incarnations over the past century.

The Fort Lewis high school expanded into a two-year college in the 1930s, and in 1948 it became Fort Lewis A&M College, under the State Board of Agriculture's control. The "Aggies" studying at the Fort Lewis Branch of the Colorado State College of Agriculture and Mechanics could take courses in agriculture, forestry, engineering, veterinary science, and home economics.

Here, FLC became a four-year institution, awarding its first baccalaureate degrees in 1964.

Also in 1964, the college dropped the "A&M" moniker, changed its mascot from the Aggies to the Raiders, and changed the school's colors from the green and yellow of the Colorado State University system it had been affiliated with to blue and gold. In 1994, the college's mascot became the Skyhawks. In 1995, FLC joined the Council of Public Liberal Arts Colleges, and in 2002, it became independent of the Colorado State University system and formed its own governing Board of Trustees.

Campus
The 247-acre Fort Lewis College campus is in southwestern Colorado, 6,872 feet atop a mesa overlooking the Animas River Valley and downtown Durango. A network of trails as well as city bus service (free to students with FLC IDs) connects the campus and town.

The campus's distinctive architectural theme utilizes locally quarried sandstone to acknowledge the region's Native pueblo building style and evoke the Four Corners landscape and colors. The style was crafted by Boulder architect James M. Hunter, whom the college contracted to establish a campus building plan in the late 1950s, after its move from Hesperus to Durango.

Today, on-campus housing is in six residence halls and two apartment buildings, with singles, doubles, and suites. Also on campus are 14 academic buildings, as well as a Student Life Center, Aquatic Center, and Student Union. On-campus athletic facilities include Ray Dennison Memorial Field, Dirks Field, the Softball Complex, Whalen Gymnasium, and the Factory Trails, an off-road bicycling race course.

The new Student Union opened in 2011, and hosts the college's cultural centers, the Native American Center and El Centro de Muchos Colores, student government, the Environmental Center, the post office, and the bookstore. The Student Union also offers several dining options, and houses both a Leadership Center and a Media Center that includes the college's news magazine, literary journal, and KDUR radio station.

The U.S. Green Building Council awarded the Student Union LEED Gold status for its sustainability features. It is the third LEED Gold building on campus, along with the Berndt Hall Biology Wing and Animas Hall. Those environmental awards helped FLC be named one of "America's Coolest Schools" by Sierra magazine, the official publication of the Sierra Club, in 2011.

Academics
Fort Lewis College is divided into four academic units, offering 32 baccalaureate degrees. Programs are accredited by the Higher Learning Commission, the Accreditation Board for Engineering & Technology, the American Chemical Society, the Association to Advance Collegiate Schools of Business, the Commission on Accreditation of Athletic Training Education, and the National Association of Schools of Music.

Athletics

The college's athletic teams, the Skyhawks, compete in the NCAA at the Division II level as a member of the Rocky Mountain Athletic Conference (RMAC); as well as the Western Intercollegiate Lacrosse Association (WILA) for women's lacrosse and a nationally ranked cycling program that competes at the Division I level of USA Collegiate Cycling. In 2017, FLC's cycling program won its 23rd national championship at the 2017 USA Cycling Collegiate Mountain Bike National Championships in Missoula, Montana.

The term student-athlete was coined in 1957 following a lawsuit that arose after the death of Ray Dennison, a Fort Lewis A&M College football player.

Men's sports
 Basketball 
 Cross Country
 Cycling
 Football 
 Golf 
 Soccer

Women's sports
 Basketball
 Cross Country
 Cycling
 Lacrosse
 Soccer
 Softball
 Volleyball

Notable alumni

 David M. Beazley – Python developer and author
 Chris Camozzi (attended) – competed in wrestling and rugby; professional mixed martial artist
 Nicco Montaño – professional Mixed Martial Artist, inaugural and current UFC Flyweight Champion. First UFC Champion with Navajo descent.
 Pamela Neary – Minnesota state legislator
 Brianne Nelson – distance runner
 Scott Stamper – running back for the San Antonio Gunslingers in the USFL
 Scott Tipton – United States House of Representatives (CO-3 R)

References

External links

 

 
Lewis
Liberal arts colleges in Colorado
Public universities and colleges in Colorado
Buildings and structures in La Plata County, Colorado
Colorado Western Slope
Durango, Colorado
Education in La Plata County, Colorado
Educational institutions established in 1911
1911 establishments in Colorado
Tourist attractions in La Plata County, Colorado
Public liberal arts colleges in the United States
Universities and colleges accredited by the Higher Learning Commission